James Thomas Milling, Jr. (born February 14, 1965) is a former professional American football wide receiver in the  National Football League. He played three seasons for the Atlanta Falcons.

References

1965 births
Living people
People from Winnsboro, South Carolina
Players of American football from South Carolina
American football wide receivers
Maryland Terrapins football players
Atlanta Falcons players
New York Giants players